Lone Star High School is a public high school located in the city of Frisco, Texas, United States and classified as a 5A school by the UIL. It is a part of the Frisco Independent School District. In 2015, the school was rated as "Met Standard" by the Texas Education Agency.

History
The campus opened in the fall of 2009 as an annex for students from Wakeland High School. In the fall of 2010, it formally opened with its own attendance zone. It is one of twelve high schools in Frisco ISD. In 2012, the official enrollment from 9th-12th grade was 952. Naming of the school was inspired by the movie Lone Star (1996) from director John Sayles, a fictional neo-western murder mystery involving the Texas Rangers. The school mascot and sports teams are the Rangers.

Athletics

The Lone Star Rangers compete in the following sports:
 Baseball
 Basketball
 Cross country
 Football
 Golf
 Powerlifting
 Soccer
 Softball
 Swimming and diving
 Tennis
 Track and field
 Volleyball
 Wrestling

State titles
Girls Track. Men's football*
2013(3A)

Extracurricular activities
As for other extracurricular activities, the fine arts department is excelling. Band and color guard have won numerous awards and competitions for years with competitions throughout the football season. As of the 2015 season, the school has only been open 6 years and the band has made Sweepstakes ratings (A rating of 1 from all 3 judges, the best rating possible) every single year. The drill team has also competed in spring competitions throughout the years. The theatre program has performed many musicals and plays with the UIL groups. Later in the 2016 season, the football team (Lone Star Rangers) made it up to state in 5A UIL, and lost. In 2019 the band competed in the state UIL competition, and advanced to finals. In 2021, the band went to UIL State Marching Contest and got 16th after a successful marching season.

Lone Star Shooting Threat 
Lone Star High School cancelled school on December 12 and 13, 2021 after a student brought a BB gun to school and made bomb threats against the school on social media. The matter was handled swiftly by the Frisco Police Department but led to hysteria and panic among students at Lone Star and nearby schools.

Notable Alumni 
Notable Alumni (sorted by relevance) of Lone Star High School include:

 Tharun Kumar Tiruppali Kalidoss, youngest winner of Princeton DeSo Hackathon Competition
 Marvin Mims, college American football player for University of Oklahoma
 Nick Bolton, professional American football player and Super Bowl winner for the Kansas City Chiefs
 P. J. Washington, professional Basketball player for the Charlotte Hornets

References

External links

Frisco Independent School District
Lone Star High School Basketball website
Lone Star High School Football website

Educational institutions established in 2010
High schools in Denton County, Texas
2010 establishments in Texas
Frisco Independent School District high schools
Frisco, Texas